The Tipping Point is the sixth studio album by American hip hop band the Roots, released July 13, 2004 on Geffen Records. It is named after Malcolm Gladwell's book of the same name (2000), and is the follow-up to Phrenology (2002). The album is a musical departure from their previous work, featuring a more diverse, yet pop-oriented sound, and it contains lyrics associated with rapping-prowess, political insight, and social commentary. The Tipping Point has been noted by music writers for exhibiting and emphasizing soul, jazz, and funk influences as well. The song "I Don't Care" was featured on the soundtrack of the game Gran Turismo 4.

The cover image is a stylised rendering of a 1944 Boston police mug shot of Malcolm X, following his arrest for larceny.

Reception

The album debuted at number four on the U.S. Billboard 200 chart, selling 109,000 copies in its first week. Despite mixed criticism towards its production and lyrical substance, The Tipping Point received generally positive reviews from most music critics, based on an aggregate score of 72 out of 100 on Metacritic.

Track listing

Sample credits
 "Star" samples "Everybody Is a Star" by Sly & The Family Stone
 "Stay Cool" samples "Harlem Hendoo" by Al Hirt
 "Web" samples "Dance Girl" by The Rimshots

Extra Notes
 i = "Why (What's Goin' On?" only
 ii = "In Love With The Mic" only
 iii = "Din Da Da" only
 iv = "Why (What's Goin' On?)" and "In Love With The Mic" only

Personnel
The Roots
 Vocals: Tariq 'Black Thought' Trotter
 Bass: Adam Blackstone & Leonard 'Hub' Hubbard
 Drums: Ahmir 'Questlove' Thompson
 Guitars: Anthony Tidd, Captain Kirk Douglas & Martin Luther
 Horns: Kevin Hanson
 Sound Manipulation: Si McMenamin
 Keyboards: Kamal Gray & Omar Edwards
 Percussion: Frank 'Knuckles' Walker

Production
 Producers: Questlove, Scott Storch, Melvin 'Chaos' Walker, Anthony Tidd, Frank 'Knuckles' Walker, Richard Nichols, Robert 'LB' Dorsey, Tahir, Zoukhari
 Executive Producer: Richard Nichols

Charts

Weekly charts

Year-end charts

References

Notes

External links
 The Tipping Point at Discogs
 The Tipping Point at Metacritic

The Roots albums
2004 albums
Albums produced by Questlove
Albums produced by Scott Storch
Geffen Records albums